Rancho Deluxe is the soundtrack from the film Rancho Deluxe starring Jeff Bridges and Sam Waterston. It is the sixth album by American singer-songwriter Jimmy Buffett.  It was initially released in 1975 as United Artists Records UA 466G and later re-released on labels licensed by Metro-Goldwyn-Mayer (who owns the soundtrack's rights) including Capitol and Rykodisc.

Alternative versions
The 1998 Rykodisc re-release of Rancho Deluxe includes four tracks of movie dialogue that were not present on the original soundtrack.

Songs
The soundtrack album contains songs and instrumental incidental music, all written by Buffett.  "Wonder Why We Ever Go Home" and "Livingston Saturday Night" were subsequently re-recorded by Buffett and released on Changes in Latitudes, Changes in Attitudes and Son of a Son of a Sailor respectively.  Both of the remakes are significantly different than the Rancho Deluxe originals.  "Livingston Saturday Night" is a monaural recording and has significant lyrical changes (e.g., "sixteen may get you twenty" becomes "fifteen may get you twenty") and "Wonder Why We Ever Go Home" is extended to become a full-length song.

Unlike the music of his previous three albums, Rancho Deluxe is a heavily country album with none of the "gulf and western" feel that has typified most of Buffett's career.  It is his only album that contains a song that Buffett himself does not sing on, "Left Me with A Nail to Drive" with vocals by Coral Reefer Band member Roger Bartlett.

There were no singles released from the album. 

A one-sided 33 rpm 7" Radio Spots record was released by United Artists UAC 222 to advertise the movie. The advertisement jingle was not by Jimmy Buffett.

Track listing

Original release
Side One:
"Rancho Deluxe (Main Title)" (Jimmy Buffett) – 2:12
"Ridin' in Style"* (Jimmy Buffett) – 1:05
"Left Me with a Nail to Drive" (Jimmy Buffett) – 1:33
"Cattle Truckin'"* (Jimmy Buffett) – 1:27
"Countin' the Cows Ev'ry Day" (Jimmy Buffett) – 2:23
"The Wrangler"* (Jimmy Buffett) – 2:09
"Rancho Deluxe (End Title)" (Jimmy Buffett) – 2:54
Side Two:
"Livingston Saturday Night" (Jimmy Buffett) – 3:28
"Some Gothic Ranch Action"* (Jimmy Buffett) – 1:26
"Wonder Why We Ever Go Home" (Jimmy Buffett) – 1:48
"Fifteen Gears"* (Jimmy Buffett) – 2:14
"Can't Remember when I Slept Last" (Jimmy Buffett) – 1:38
"Rancho Deluxe (Instrumental)"* (Jimmy Buffett) – 4:10
*Instrumental recordings

1998 re-release
"Rancho Deluxe (Main Title)" (Jimmy Buffett) – 2:12
"X-Mas Bonus"† – 0:16
"Ridin' in Style"* (Jimmy Buffett) – 1:05
"Left Me with a Nail to Drive" (Jimmy Buffett) – 1:33
"Rustler's That's Us"† – 0:09
"Cattle Truckin'"* (Jimmy Buffett) – 1:27
"Countin' the Cows Ev'ry Day" (Jimmy Buffett) – 2:23
"The Wrangler"* (Jimmy Buffett) – 2:09
"Rancho Deluxe (End Title)" (Jimmy Buffett) – 2:54
"Livingston Saturday Night" (Jimmy Buffett) – 3:28
"Dork"† – 0:23
"Some Gothic Ranch Action"* (Jimmy Buffett) – 1:26
"Wonder Why We Ever Go Home" (Jimmy Buffett) – 1:48
"Hood Ornament"† – 0:11
"Fifteen Gears"* (Jimmy Buffett) – 2:14
"Can't Remember when I Slept Last" (Jimmy Buffett) – 1:38
"Rancho Deluxe (Instrumental)"* (Jimmy Buffett) – 4:10
*Instrumental recordings
†Movie dialog track

Personnel
Jimmy Buffett – Guitar, vocals
Roger Bartlett – Guitar, vocals on "Left Me with A Nail to Drive"
Tommy Cogbill – Bass
Sammy Creason – Drums
Phillip Fajardo – Drums
Doyle Grisham – Steel guitar
Greg "Fingers" Taylor – Harmonica
Reggie Young – Electric guitar
Michael Utley – Keyboards

Notes

Western film soundtracks
1975 soundtrack albums
Jimmy Buffett soundtracks
United Artists Records soundtracks
Capitol Records soundtracks
Rykodisc soundtracks